The Last Dive: A Father and Son's Fatal Descent into the Ocean's Depths (2000) is a non-fiction book written by diver Bernie Chowdhury and published by HarperCollins. It documents the fatal dive of Chris Rouse, Sr. and Chris "Chrissy" Rouse, Jr., a father-son team who perished off the New Jersey coast in 1992. The author is a dive expert and was a friend of the Rouses.

Although experienced in using technical diving gas mixtures such as "trimix" (adding helium gas to the nitrogen and oxygen found in air), they were diving on just compressed air. The pair had set out to retrieve the captain's log book from the so-called U-Who to "fulfill their dream of diving into fame."

Chowdhury is a technical diver who, according to writer Neal Matthews' review of Robert Kurson's book Shadow Divers (2004), "was among the first to adapt cave-diving principles to deep-water wrecks". Also according to Matthews, "His book documents how the clashes of equipment philosophy between cave divers and wreck divers mirrored the clash of diving subcultures."

References

External links
  Publisher's write-up on The Last Dive

Underwater diving books
1992 in New Jersey
Technical diving
Underwater diving deaths
Books about sportspeople